El Mirasol was a 37-room Spanish Colonial Revival mansion at 348 North Ocean Boulevard in Palm Beach, Florida. 

Designed by architect Addison Mizner for financier Edward T. Stotesbury, it was completed in 1920.

Stotesbury's second wife Lucretia (Eva) Stotesbury was the one who convinced her husband to hire Mizner. She added on to the mansion several times. It extended from the Intracoastal to the ocean, two blocks. At the end it included a 40-car garage, a tea house, an auditorium, and a private zoo.

El Mirasol ( The Sunflower ) was demolished in 1959.

References

Palm Beach, Florida
Addison Mizner buildings
Spanish Colonial Revival architecture in Florida
Houses completed in 1919
Houses in Palm Beach County, Florida
Buildings and structures demolished in 1959
1919 establishments in Florida
1950s disestablishments in Florida